This is a list of airlines of Greenland.

Currently operating

See also
 List of airlines
 List of airlines of Denmark
 List of defunct airlines of Denmark

References

Greenland

Airlines
Airlines
Airlines
Greenland
+Greenland
Airlines